Phrase chunking is a phase of natural language processing that separates and segments a sentence into its subconstituents, such as noun, verb, and prepositional phrases, abbreviated as NP, VP, and PP, respectively. Typically, each subconstituent or chunk is denoted by brackets.

See also
Terminology extraction
Part-of-speech tagging
Constituent (linguistics)

External links
TermExtractor
TreeTagger Chunker

References 

Tasks of natural language processing